Riot City: Protest and Rebellion in the Capital is a 2012 book by British academic, broadcaster and author, Clive Bloom. The book deals with the history of protest movements in London and political radicalism in the capital.

Background
Clive Bloom is an Emeritus Professor of English and American studies at Middlesex University. The book examines the rebellion in the city, particularly examining radical political movements. It investigates Occupy London, the 2010 United Kingdom student protests alongside historic movements. Bloom writes that 'protest is the raw and vital edge of being a Londoner'.

Reception
Chris Gilson, from the London School of Economics and Political Science wrote that the book was a 'timely work', while the book was also reviewed in the Financial Times, and The Spectator.

References

External links 

 

2012 non-fiction books
Politics of London
Protests in London
Books about London
History books about London
Books about Marxism
Books about politics of the United Kingdom
Palgrave Macmillan books